BCR (Brick City Rock) is one of the regional manifestations of the Jailhouse rock (fighting style).
It can be traced in origin to Newark, New Jersey during the late-1960s and early-1970s. 

During this time, BCR was trained primarily in communal "cliques" of mostly Afro-Caribbean and African-American youths during informal sparring sessions set to music known as "Rock Parties". BCR was also trained perhaps more commonly, through impromptu Slap-Boxing matches in the inner-city of Newark N.J. and the surrounding areas.

Brick City Rock shares a commonality with some forms of ADMA (African Diaspora Martial Arts) in that it is trained through a communal sport/game "play" structure set to music. 

Practitioners of BCR claim to reject training sequences and encourage spontaneous adaption of techniques in response to the objective at hand.

BCR is typified by its footwork and movements that resembled improvised dance moves.

References

External links
 Watch The History of 52 Blocks Documentary (2009)
 Douglas Century, Street Kingdom: Five Years Inside the Franklin Avenue Posse, Warner Books, 2000, 
 Douglas Century, "Ghetto Blasters: Born in prison, raised in the 'hood, the deadly art of 52 Blocks is Brooklyn's baddest secret", Details magazine 19:9, pp 77–79, August 2001.
 Dennis Newsome, Jailhouse Rock (A.k.a) 52 blocks system.
 http://malandros-touro.com/jailhouserock.html
 Green, Thomas "Freeing the Afrikan Mind: the Role of Martial Arts in Contemporary African American Cultural Nationalism", essay featured in "Martial Arts in the Modern World", Praeger Publishers, 2003, 
 
 J.S. Soet, 'Martial Arts Around the World, Unique Publications, 1991

North American martial arts
Sports in Newark, New Jersey